Mathias Weissenbacher (born 3 February 1992) is an Austrian snowboarder. He is a participant at the 2014 Winter Olympics in Sochi.

References

External links
 

1992 births
Snowboarders at the 2014 Winter Olympics
Living people
Olympic snowboarders of Austria
Austrian male snowboarders
Place of birth missing (living people)